Philip Ozouf is a Jersey politician who is currently serving as the Minister for External Relations and Financial Services and a Deputy for the Parish of St Saviour. He was a member of the States of Jersey from 1999 until 2018, serving as Economic Development Minister, Treasury and Resources Minister, and Assistant Chief Minister in the Council of Ministers.

Early life and education 
Philip Francis Cyril Ozouf was born in Jersey. He is the son of farmer and former Connétable of Saint Saviour Philip Francis Ozouf.

He was educated at Victoria College, Jersey, then attended the European Business School in London, Frankfurt and Paris; he gained a BA (Hons) International Business and French Equivalent. He also qualified to diploma stage of the Chartered Institute of Management Accountants. He describes himself as a "reasonably fluent" French, German and Spanish speaker.

Electoral history 
He was elected to the States of Jersey as a Deputy for Saint Helier District 3&4, in November 1999, topping the poll with 1,618 votes, a record number of votes in this district.

He was then elected a Senator in 2002, topping the poll with 14,442 votes. He was re-elected in 2008 in 5th position with 8,712 votes. He was re-elected a senator in 2014 with 10,062 votes.

He did not stand for re-election in the 2018 elections.

Responsibilities 
Senator Ozouf serves as Vice Chairman of the Alliance Française Jersey branch.

Previous posts

Assistant Chief Minister
From the October 2014 election Senator Ozouf acted as Assistant Chief Minister with responsibility for Financial Services, Digital, Competition and Innovation matters, assuming full responsibility for Jersey's Innovation Fund at the beginning of 2016.  On 20 January 2017 the Chief Minister confirmed that he had received and accepted Senator Ozouf's formal resignation from the post following publication of a report from the Auditor General criticising the way in which the Jersey Innovation Fund had lost a substantial part of the public funds entrusted to it.

Privileges and Procedures Committee
Ozouf served on the Privileges and Procedures Committee.

Treasury
Between December 2008 and October 2014, Ozouf had been Treasury Minister in the Council of Ministers. He was proposed for the post by the Chief Minister, Terry Le Sueur, and received 38 votes, beating Deputy Geoff Southern who received 13 votes.

Economic development
From 2005 to 2008, Ozouf was Economic Development Minister in the Council of Ministers. This role had a wide remit, taking responsibility for subjects as varied as transport links, the Competition Law, the Rural Strategy. He was primarily tasked with achieving 2% real economic growth annually. This was something which has been recognised, even by his critics, as no small task. Ozouf was a strong supporter of the Goods and Sales Tax (GST), introduced on 6 May 2008 and initially levied at 3%.

Other roles
Ozouf was vice chairman of the States of Jersey Employment Board.

He is a former member of the Jersey Legal Information Board, a statutory body with the remit to improve access to information about the Jersey law.

He also served as a board member of the Jersey Communities Relations Trust, a States sponsored body that works to ensure that minority groups in Jersey are not disadvantaged.

He was also a member of the Jersey branch of the Assemblée Parlementaire de la Francophonie

Political campaigns 
Ozouf, who is gay, supported the campaign for the introduction of a Civil Partnership law in Jersey, which the States of Jersey passed in July 2011.

Ozouf was responsible for 'cleaning up' the Jersey fulfillment industry by preventing companies who sought to exploit the UK VAT threshold by establishing a Jersey mailbox. The move drew criticism from Deputy Geoff Southern, as Chair of the Economic Affairs scrutiny panel, however the move was welcomed by Jersey businesses.

Criticisms
In 2006, Ozouf was the first Minister in Jersey's history to be reprimanded for breaching procedure after he gave extra funding of £95,000 to Jersey's Battle of Flowers Association against the advice of his own officers

In 2012, Ozouf was the subject of criticism over the States of Jersey's failed plan to purchase Lime Grove House, an office building, for the intended use as a new police headquarters for the States of Jersey Police. Senator Sarah Ferguson lodged a vote of censure against Ozouf, which was later withdrawn. According to Ozouf the Lime Grove House building would have been unsuitable, and as an alternative, part of the adjacent Green Street public car park could be used as a site for a new police headquarters. In mid-2013 plans to build a new police building on part of Green Street car park were approved, and its completion is due in early 2017.

Campaigns

Gambling in Jersey
Ozouf has called for Jersey to reform its gambling laws.

Financial Ombudsman
Ozouf has called for the installation of a Financial Ombudsman in Jersey.

Ensuring competition of ferry routes
Ozouf has been a primary driver for the move towards competition on ferry routes into and out of Jersey and continues to seek the most competitive prices for Jersey people.

International representation
Ozouf attended the sixth meeting of the British-Irish Council on environment.

References

Further reading 
 Economic Development 2007 Business Plan

External links
Official website

Jersey Roman Catholics
Government ministers of Jersey
Living people
1970 births
People educated at Victoria College, Jersey
Senators of Jersey
Deputies of Jersey
Gay politicians
Alumni of European Business School London